DutchBird was a charter airline based in Amsterdam, Netherlands. It operated charter services to the Mediterranean, Egypt, Tunisia and the Canary Islands for a number of holiday companies. Its main base was Schiphol Airport.

History
The airline was established in 2000 and started operations on November 22, 2000. It was founded by Hans Mosselman, CEO of Sudtours travel, and began operations with a Boeing 757 aircraft leased from Condor.

From 2001 to 2003, DutchBird was awarded “The best Dutch charter airline”. DutchBird’s special family oriented service included attractive extras for parents who travel with children. Frequent passengers included conference members, symphony orchestras and footballers of AFC Ajax. DutchBird was the “Official Carrier of Ajax” since September 2002.

On November 25, 2004, ExelAviation Group attempted to purchase DutchBird, but was later cancelled.

All flights were stopped by December 2004 and the airline went under Dutch bankruptcy protection on January 27, 2005.

Fleet

The DutchBird fleet consisted of the following aircraft:

See also
List of defunct airlines of the Netherlands

References

External links

Defunct airlines of the Netherlands
Airlines established in 2000
Airlines disestablished in 2004
2000 establishments in the Netherlands